Bernard Yurke is an American physicist, currently a Distinguished Research Professor at Boise State University and an Elected Fellow of the American Association for the Advancement of Science.

See also
DNA machine
DNA nanotechnology
SU (1,1) Interferometry
Toehold mediated strand displacement

References

Year of birth missing (living people)
Living people
Fellows of the American Association for the Advancement of Science
Boise State University faculty
21st-century American physicists
DNA nanotechnology people
University of Texas at Austin alumni
Cornell University alumni
Fellows of the American Physical Society